Asad Chowdhury (born 11 February 1943) is a poet, writer, translator, radio, television personality and journalist, as well as a cultural activist in Bangladesh. He won Ekushey Padak in 2013 and Bangla Academy Literary Award in 1987.

Early life and family
Choudhury was born on 11 February 1943, to an aristocratic Bengali Muslim family known as the Zamindars of Ulania in Mehendiganj, then located under the Backergunge District of the Bengal Province. His ancestor, Shaykh Muhammad Asad Ali, arrived migrated from Persia to Ayodhya, later settling in the Bengali city of Murshidabad. Ali's great great great grandson Muhammad Hanif served as a military commander under Shaista Khan, the Mughal governor of Bengal. He was noted to have contributed to the suppression of Arakanese and Portuguese pirates in the Bay of Bengal. Hanif then entered the greater Barisal region where he served as the Jamadar of the Sangram Fort in Govindapur and settled in the village of Tetulia, Hizla. The family were later endowed the title of Choudhury, and from his descendants, Muhammad Taqi migrated from the Tetulia Jamadar Bari to the village of Ulania. His son, Hasan Raja, was Asad Chowdhury's great grandfather. Hasan Raja and his two brothers, Naya Raja and Kala Raja, became notable as traders of areca nut, salt and rice, and built strong relationships with the Marwari merchants of Calcutta during the Company Raj. The three brothers established the ports of Lalganj, Aliganj and Kaliganj, and with their amassed wealth, established the zamindari of Idilpur. Raja's son was Majid Chowdhury, whose son was Eslam Chowdhury, whose son Muhammad Arif Chowdhury was Asad Choudhury's father.

Education and career
Chowdhury completed his master's degree in Bengali in 1964 from the University of Dhaka.  He started his profession as a lecturer in Bengali language and literature at Brahmanbaria College in 1973. During the liberation war of Bangladesh, he was a contributor and broadcaster of Swadhin Bangla Betar Kendra in Kolkata. He has also been assistant editor in “The Joybangla” (Kalkata, 1971) and in “The Daily Janapada” (Dhaka, February 1973). He was a correspondent for The Daily Purbodesh from 1968 to 1971. He served as the director at the Bangla Academy, Dhaka and worked as an editor at the Bengali service of Deutsche Welle after his retirement.

Chowdhury is a life member of the Asiatic Society of Bangladesh and a fellow of Bangla Academy, Dhaka, as well as being the ex-Vice President of The Radio and TV Artists Association. He has held many other positions over his life, including:

 Life member of Bigana Samskriti Parshad, Dhaka
 Life member of Bhasha Sammmiti, Dhaka
 Member of the Presidium Jatyo Kabita Utsabe, Dhaka
 Founder, President of Deutsche Banglische Geselschaft E.V. Bonn, Koln, Germany Ex-Member, R.F.F.U.
 Founder, Vice-President of Chandradeep, Dhaka
 Founder, Vice-President of the Bangladesh Writers Club, Dhaka
 An associated Member of the National Press Club, Dhaka
 Founder President of the Bengali-Urdu Sahitya Foundation

Publications

Poems
 Tabak Deya Pan, 1975
 Bitto Nai Besat Nai, 1976
 Ekka Dokka, 1980
 Joler Madhye Lekhajokha, 1982
 Je Pare Paruk, 1983
 Modhya Math Theke, 1984
 Megher Julum Pakhir Julum, 1987
 Nadio Bibastro Hoi, 1992
 Premer Kabita, 1992
 Garbo Amar Anek Kichur, 1994
 Tan Bhalobasher Kabita, 1996
 Batash Jemon Parchito, 1998
 Brishtir Sansare Ami Keo Noi 1998
 Kichu Phool Ami Niviye Diechi, 2003
 Prem o Prakritr Kobita, 2003
 Barir Kache Asri Nagar, 2003 (translation of the contemporary Urdu poets)

Folk tales

 Teen Rasarajer Adda, 1998
 Vin Desher Lok Kahini, 1998
 John Henry, 2001
 Chotother Mojar Golpo, 2001
 Annya Desher Lok-Kahini, 2004

Other

 Kon Alokar Phool, 1982 (essay)
 Rajanikanta Sen, 1989 (biography)
 Kabita Samagra, 2000
 Maichalengelo, 2001 (biography)

Translations

Chowdhury's publications have been translated into English, French, German, Hindi, Urdu, Malayalam and published in the US, Canada, UK, France, India, and Pakistan.

Cassettes

 Padavali (1981)
 Moder Garab Moder Asha (1985)
 Sangbarta (1989)
 Premer Kabira (1992)

Radio and television production

Chowdhury conducted Kathakali, a weekly program from 1973 to 1981, and prepared manuscripts for, conducted and participated in many programs of Radio Bangladesh.

Other activities

Chowdhury participated in poetry sessions and recitations arranged by Bangla Academy, German Culture Institute, American Culture Centre, Alliance Francaise, Russian Cultural Centre, Iranian Cultural Centre, Islamic Foundation, as well as other cultural organizations of Bangladesh. He delivered a keynote at a seminar, organised by Afro-Asian

More recently, he has read poems at a festival organised by the Bangladesh Association in Pittsburgh in 2000, and attended Mukti Judha Uthsab in Agartala, India in January 2001.

References

1943 births
Living people
Bangladeshi male poets
Recipients of the Ekushey Padak
Recipients of Bangla Academy Award
Recipients of Mazharul Islam Poetry Award
Bangladeshi people of Iranian descent